Nothochrysa is a genus of green lacewings in the family Chrysopidae. There are about 10 described species in Nothochrysa.

Species
These 10 species belong to the genus Nothochrysa:
 Nothochrysa californica Banks, 1892 (San Francisco lacewing)
 Nothochrysa capitata (Fabricius, 1793)
 Nothochrysa fulviceps (Stephens, 1836)
 Nothochrysa indigena Needham, 1909
 Nothochrysa polemia Navás, 1917
 Nothochrysa praeclara Statz, 1936
 Nothochrysa sinica C.-k. Yang, 1986
 Nothochrysa stampieni Nel & Séméria, 1986
 Nothochrysa turcica Kovanci & Canbulat, 2007
 † Notochrysa praeclara Statz, 1936

References

Further reading

External links

 

Chrysopidae
Articles created by Qbugbot